Adolf Endler (20 September 1930 – 2 August 2009) was a lyric poet, essayist and prose author who played a central role in subcultural activities that attacked and challenged an outdated model of socialist realism in the German Democratic Republic up until the collapse of communism in the early 1990s. Endler drew attention to himself as the "father of the oppositional literary scene" at Prenzlauer Berg in the eastern part of Berlin. In 2005 he was made a member of the Deutsche Akademie für Sprache und Dichtung in Darmstadt.

Early life and career
A communist as a young man, Endler moved to East Germany in 1955 and studied at the Johannes R. Becher Institute of Literature in Leipzig from 1955–57. An acclaimed poet, he was well respected in the East and West, but at the same time was marginalized and degraded by party functionaries who controlled the fields of cultural practice, conspired to guard their concepts of aesthetics, and went as far as to extend their influence into the writer's private life.

Even though socialist realism had spread over most of Eastern European cultural life, it was successfully undermined by writers and artists like Endler. His defiance involved ignoring orders from cultural politicians and finding alternative ways of communicating with peers. In 1978 he coined the term Sächsische Dichterschule to describe the group of German writers who were born in the 1930s and were influential in the areas of poetry, such as, Karl Mickel, Heinz Czechowski, Sarah Kirsch and Volker Braun. This sentiment is shared by Michael Hamburger, who, before the group had been named, applauded those  that they had been creative in an artistically hostile environment. Hamburger recorded the traffic of correspondence between individual poets -a secret project that held the young writers together in a state that promoted the exact opposite, i.e. the isolation of individual deviants. His colleague in exile, the Austrian Erich Fried (Fried and Hamburger went into exile in Great Britain during Hitler's Third Reich), documented some of this writing for the BBC in his review of the anthology In diesem besseren Land (1966).

Into the seventies, Endler remained steadfastly confrontational. Following the expatriation from the GDR of songwriter Wolf Biermann in 1976, Endler was expelled from the Writers’ Association of the GDR in 1979, having declared his solidarity with his previously reprimanded colleague Stefan Heym. Throughout the 1980s he contributed to various Berlin and Leipzig underground magazines.

In the 1990s, Adolf Endler became known to a wider public through a volume of memoirs entitled Tarzan am Prenzlauer Berg (i.e. Tarzan at Prenzlauer Berg) and from 1991 to 1998, with Brigitte Schreier-Endler, he organised the legendary “Orplid&Co.“ readings in Café Clara in Berlin-Mitte. Mr. Endler died after a long illness.

Quotations
A lot of people connect liberalization with the fact that the GDR for international reason didn't want to have any trouble. The GDR wanted to be thought of in the international community as something very decent and without blemish. That was something we went along with. Our only means of power was to threaten to make an international fuss. If a book had been published in the west, and then the author had been sent to jail, there would have been a fuss. There must have been five hundred of us who had written letters or who had collected signatures. There weren't three hundred thousand people, but there were always ten or twenty thousand refractory people who as a rule wanted to stay in the GDR, but who, out of some sort of defiance or whatever, weren't ready to put up with it. They weren't the people who had left because they were fed up to the teeth." -March 15th, 1992.

Quotes about
“He admired those who play with language like Kurt Schwitters and Alfred Jarry, astute minds like Karl Kraus and Georg Christoph Lichtenberg and great epic writers like François Rabelais and Hans Henny Jahnn. It was only after the political turnaround of 1989 that people noticed that he does not compare at all unfavourably with them – but not too late, thank goodness.”

Works

Erwacht ohne Furcht, Gedichte 1960
Weg in die Wische, Reportagen und Gedichte 1960
Das Sandkorn, Gedichte, Mitteldeutscher Verlag 1974/1976
Die Kinder der Nibelungen, Gedichte 1964
In diesem besseren Land, Lyrik-Anthologie gemeinsam mit Karl Mickel 1966
Nackt mit Brille, Gedichte 1975
Zwei Versuche, über Georgien zu erzählen, Reisebericht 1976
Verwirrte klare Botschaften, Gedichte 1979
Nadelkissen, Prosa 1980
Akte Endler, Gedichte aus 30 Jahren 1981/1988
Tarzan am Prenzlauer Berg, Tagebuch 1984
Ohne Nennung von Gründen, Prosa 1985
Schichtenflotz, Prosa 1987
Nächtlicher Besucher, in seine Schranken gewiesen. Eine Fortsetzungszüchtigung, Berliner Handpresse, Berlin 1989. Wallstein, Göttingen 2008, 
Vorbildlich schleimlösend, Prosa 1990
Den Tiger reiten, Essays 1990
Die Antwort des Poeten, Roman 1992
Tarzan am Prenzlauer Berg. Sudelblätter 1981–1993, Reclam Leipzig, Leipzig 1994, 
Warnung vor Utah, Reisebuch 1996
Der Pudding der Apokalypse. Gedichte 1963–1998, Suhrkamp, Frankfurt/Main 1999, 
Trotzes halber, Gedichte 1999
Das Greisenalter, voilà 2001
Schweigen Schreiben Reden Schweigen. Reden 1995–2001, Suhrkamp, Frankfurt/Main 2003, 
Uns überholte der Zugvögelzug. Alte und neue Gedichte, UN ART IG, Aschersleben 2004, 
Nebbich. Eine deutsche Karriere, Wallstein, Göttingen 2005, 
Krähenüberkrächzte Rolltreppe. Neunundsiebzig kurze Gedichte aus einem halben Jahrhundert, Wallstein, Göttingen 2007 
Nächtlicher Besucher, in seine Schranken gewiesen. Eine Fortsetzungs-Züchtigung, Wallstein, Göttingen 2008,  (editierte Neuauflage)

Literary awards
1978: Literatur-Förderpreis zum Kunstpreis der Akademie der Künste West-Berlin (Academy of the Arts, West Berlin)
1990: Heinrich-Mann-Preis der Akademie der Künste Ost-Berlin (Academy of the Arts East Berlin) – together with Elke Erb
1994: Brandenburgischer Literaturpreis
1995: Kritikerpreis der SWF-Bestenliste (Critics Award of the SWF Leaderboard)
1995: Brothers Grimm Prize of the City of Hanau
1996: Rahel Varnhagen von Ense-Medaille – together with Brigitte Schreier-Endler
1998: Ehrengabe der Deutschen Schillerstiftung (German Schiller Foundation)
2000: Peter-Huchel Prize
2000: Literature Prize of the City of Bremen
2001: Bundesverdienstkreuz 1st Class
2003: Hans-Erich Nossack Prize
2008: Rainer Malkowski Prize jointly with Kurt Drawert

References

External links
 Texte und Hörtexte von Adolf Endler bei lyrikline.org

1930 births
2009 deaths
Writers from Düsseldorf
People from the Rhine Province
East German writers
Writers from North Rhine-Westphalia
Officers Crosses of the Order of Merit of the Federal Republic of Germany
German male poets
20th-century German poets
German-language poets
Members of the German Academy for Language and Literature
20th-century German male writers